Anginopachria is a genus of beetles in the family Dytiscidae, containing the following species:

 Anginopachria prudeki Wewalka, Balke, Hájek & Hendrich, 2005
 Anginopachria schoedli Wewalka, Balke, Hájek & Hendrich, 2005
 Anginopachria ullrichi (Balke & Hendrich, 1999)

References

Dytiscidae